The 2015 ITF Women's Circuit UBS Thurgau was a professional tennis tournament played on indoor carpet courts. It was the third of the tournament which is part of the 2015 ITF Women's Circuit, offering a total of $50,000 in prize money. It took place in Kreuzlingen, Switzerland, on 16–22 February 2015.

Women's singles entrants

Seeds 

 1 Rankings as of 9 February 2015

Other entrants 
The following players received wildcards into the singles main draw:
  Karin Kennel
  Nina Stadler
  Tess Sugnaux
  Jil Teichmann

The following players received entry from the qualifying draw:
  Jesika Malečková
  Tara Moore
  Rebecca Šramková
  Tayisiya Morderger

The following player received entry by a lucky loser spot:
  Justyna Jegiołka

The following player received entry by a protected ranking:
  Kathrin Wörle-Scheller

Champions

Singles 

  Olga Govortsova def.  Rebecca Šramková, 6–2, 6–1

Doubles 

  Lyudmyla Kichenok /  Nadiia Kichenok def.  Stéphanie Foretz /  Irina Ramialison, 6–3, 6–3

External links 
 Official website 
 2015 ITF Women's Circuit UBS Thurgau at ITFtennis.com

2015 ITF Women's Circuit
2015 in Swiss women's sport
Lugano
Tennis tournaments in Switzerland